Dangerous Paradise (Swedish: Farornas paradis) is a 1931 drama film directed by Rune Carlsten and starring Elisabeth Frisk and Ragnar Arvedson. It is now considered a lost film. It was produced and distributed by the Swedish subsidiary of Paramount Pictures at the company's Joinville Studios. It was one of a large number of multiple-language versions shot at Joinville during the early years of the sound era. It is a Swedish-language remake of the Hollywood film Dangerous Paradise based on the 1915 novel Victory by Joseph Conrad.

Cast
 Elisabeth Frisk as Anita
 Ragnar Arvedson as 	Mr. Jones
 Knut Martin as Davis
 Oscar Textorius as Mr. Schomberg
 Nils Leander as 	Ricardo

References

Bibliography 
 Goble, Alan. The Complete Index to Literary Sources in Film. Walter de Gruyter, 1999.
 Moore, Gene M. Conrad on Film. Cambridge University Press, 2006.
 Wredlund, Bertil & Lindfors, Rolf. Långfilm i Sverige: 1930-1939. Proprius, 1983.

External links 
 

1931 films
American drama films
Swedish drama films
1931 drama films
1930s Swedish-language films
Films directed by Rune Carlsten
Swedish black-and-white films
Films based on British novels
Films shot at Joinville Studios
Paramount Pictures films
Films set in Indonesia
1930s American films
1930s Swedish films